Kenya Ports Authority, commonly known as KPA, is a basketball club based in Mombasa, Kenya. Owned by the Kenya Ports Authority corporation, the team has competed in the KBF Premier League since first qualifying in 2008.

The team made their debut in international competitions during the 2002 FIBA Africa Clubs Champions Cup, losing all six games. In 2019, KPA made their debut in the Road to BAL competitions.

Roster
The following is the KPA roster for the 2020 BAL Qualifying Tournaments:

Honours
KBF Premier League
Winners (5): 2014, 2016, 2017, 2018, 2021–22

In international competitions
East, Central and Southern Africa Club Championships
 2002 –  Runner-up
FIBA Africa Clubs Champions Cup
 2002 – 7th Place
BAL Qualifying Tournaments
2020 – Second Round

References

External links 
Kenya Ports Authority at Afrobasket.com

Basketball teams in Kenya
Sport in Mombasa
Road to BAL teams